A Magic: The Gathering control deck is a type of deck or archetype that focuses on dominating the game using some or all of the following kinds of strategies: long term card advantage, resource denial, permission, and inevitability. Control decks are based around efficiency and controlling the board, which is where the name comes from. Control decks have been prominent throughout the history of Magic, and by design of the game, will always be, to varying degrees of success.

Features
Control decks generally have some combination or all of these features or strategies: card advantage, permission, resource denial, and inevitability. Though these features are not limited to only control decks, they are features that are commonly thought of when speaking about a control deck.

Card Advantage
Card advantage refers to the term of having access to more cards than the opponent. To gain card advantage, one must trade advantageously against an opponent. This exchange can be called a "two for one" for short.

Two main ways control decks gain card advantage are board "sweepers" and card drawing. Because most decks in Magic try to win through creature damage, during most portions of a game, the aggressive or midrange deck will have more than one creature on the board. By trading this way multiple times throughout the game, the control deck gains significant card advantage since it will have only used two to four cards to trade for an opponent's five to ten cards. The other major way control decks gain card advantage is through card drawing spells. These are generally used in the later portions of the game due to the fact that card drawing spells do not affect the board state. By repeatedly casting card drawing spells throughout the game, the control deck can gain huge amounts of long-term card advantage over the opponent.

Permission
Permission is the act of threatening  or any card with a similar effect. It is known as permission because an opponent playing against a control deck full of counterspells feels as if he or she needs to ask for permission to play any spell. The reason why having permission is powerful is because in a stalled board state, the control player can counter specific opponent threats that will have a large effect on the game. Furthermore, having permission often leads to gaining tempo. While neither player gets ahead in card advantage because it is a one-for-one trade, the control deck gains tempo because he or she only needs to spend two mana for the opponent's seven. The control deck can now use this leftover mana casting something else while the opponent is out of resources for that turn.

Resource Denial
Resource denial can come in many different forms. Because lands, or specifically mana, are required for playing a game in any significant way, being able to destroy lands or prevent the opponent from obtaining mana can be a powerful method of controlling the game. Another name for mana denial type decks are called "prison" decks because without access to mana, the opponent feels as if he or she is locked in a prison. While it affects the control player as well, it is more powerful than simple land destruction spells because  can destroy cards other than lands as well. Decks that build around the card  are called "Stax" decks.

Another form of resource denial is forcing an opponent to discard. While mana is thought of as the main resource in Magic, having access to cards is a resource as well. Discard is similar to card advantage, and can even gain card advantage, but it is different in that it forces the opponent to lose access to the card(s) before he or she can cast it in the first place. Discard decks aim to control the game through the fact that an opponent cannot play threats or interact without access to cards in their hand.

Inevitability
Inevitability is the idea that, given enough time, one deck by default will beat another deck. Throughout the duration of the game, players will generally trade cards for each other, or "one for one" each other. This can happen through creatures killing each other through combat, or using a removal spell or a creature, etc. Because of this, as the game goes on, each player will have less and less cards, or  resources, they have access to. This state can be described as a stalemate, or parity, and while usually it would mean a stalled game for other decks, a control deck has an advantage in this position. Because of the card advantage that control decks tend to gain during the early and mid game, the control deck's goal is to reach this state. Due to the nature of the cards that control decks use, such as high mana cost cards or high efficiency cards, when a game reaches this state, it becomes very hard for a control deck to lose, simply because their draws will be better than any other deck's draws.

Strategy
Generally, there are three phases that happen during a Magic game: early, mid, and late game; each referring to the approximate point of time in the game.

Early game
During the early game, or "development stage", the control deck attempts to stay alive. Because of the many high cost spells that control decks tend to use, the early game is where control decks are weakest. This is where aggressive decks shine, and because control decks are weak to aggression, it concentrates on staying alive and getting to the mid game.

Mid game
In the mid game, control decks try to trade cards advantageously against their opponent. This is also where the control deck focuses on stabilizing the game by answering every threat presented against it to take control of the game. Unlike the early game however, because the control deck has access to more mana, the control deck attempts to gain card advantage while trading cards with the opponent. While the control deck is happy "one-for-one"-ing in the early game, it concentrates on "x-for-one"-ing in the mid game where x is anything more than one, generally using board sweepers.

Late game
The end game is where the control deck is most powerful.

History

The first successful control deck, known as Angel Stasis, won the 1994 Magic World Championships. The deck can be classified under a resource denial or prison deck. Angel Stasis is a great example of a powerful control deck because it involves card advantage, resource denial, and inevitability. The deck can destroy opponent threats using Wrath of God or Swords to Plowshares, deny resources using Stasis or Armageddon, and gain card advantage through Ancestral Recall or Timetwister. It nullifies opponent threats using Moat and eventually wins the game with Serra Angel.

Types
There are countless types of control decks in Magic's history, and there are even decks that combine archetypes such as Aggro-Control. Listed below are example decks of four subtypes of control decks that are arguably the most prominent.

Mono Blue

Mono Black

U/W or U/W/x Control

Stax

References 

Magic: The Gathering